Ayala Malls Cloverleaf is a shopping mall developed and managed by Ayala Malls, inside the Cloverleaf Estate in Quezon City.

This is among Ayala Malls' establishments in Quezon City, after Ayala Malls Vertis North, UP Town Center and TriNoma. It is located along A. Bonifacio Avenue just near the southern end of NLEX and the boundary of Caloocan at the Balintawak Cloverleaf. The mall opened on October 25, 2017.

Cloverleaf Estate
The mall is named after the cloverleaf interchange, built in the 1960s in response to increasing traffic activity in NLEX and neighboring cities, as well as the eponymous Cloverleaf Estate, where the mall sits on. The  land is hailed as one of the green-oriented developments of Ayala Corporation. Previously a vast market and factory complex of Central Textile Mills, it features high-rise residential condominiums from Avida Towers, and a future hospital facility. It is aimed to be a mixed-use area in the heart of the city.

The Avida Towers Cloverleaf is sold out and its construction for tower 2 is currently underway.

The mall is now targeted for expansion for the Phase 2 of its mall development, with construction scheduled to start in January 2020, and was targeted to be finished by 2022. However, presumably due to the COVID-19 pandemic, the expansion is not yet in effect.

The estate is connected by various thoroughfares coming from Caloocan and Quezon City, including the Metro Manila Skyway Stage 3 and serves and provides access to the nearby barangays Balingasa and Apolonio Samson as well as a convenient stopover to and from NLEX.

Features
The mall has four levels, two parking levels above the mall, and a spacious events center as with other Ayala Malls. It has no basement levels, possibly due to the presence of a creek nearby. A large vacant lot in front of the mall, where the future hospital will be constructed, also serves as a vast paid parking area. It also features traditional amenities such as cinemas, food court and recreational facilities.

The mall features a Robinsons Supermarket and Robinsons Department Store as anchor tenants. Like other Ayala Malls, it also houses global clothing retailers including a two-level H&M store, as well as Anytime Fitness. Uniqlo, Penshoppe and other brands can be found here as well.

Transportation options include a direct link to Balintawak LRT Station, UV Express, buses, jeepneys and tricycles.

External links
Ayala Malls Cloverleaf Official website

References

Shopping malls in Quezon City
Buildings and structures in Quezon City
Ayala Malls
Shopping malls established in 2017
2017 establishments in the Philippines